Rheinbote (Rhine Messenger, or V4) was a German short range ballistic rocket developed by Rheinmetall-Borsig at Berlin-Marienfelde during World War II. It was intended to replace, or at least supplement, large-bore artillery by providing fire support at long ranges in an easily transportable form.

History 
One of the problems for the German military, and indeed any mobile military force, is the weight of the artillery and, more importantly, its ammunition supply. Battlefield rockets were intended to circumvent the problems, which led to the development of Rheinbote. The Rheinbote was the successor of the earlier Rheintochter (Rhine Maiden).

Developed in 1943 by the Rheinmetall-Borsig company, Rheinbote was a four-stage solid-fuelled rocket, and the only long-range battlefield ballistic missile to enter service in World War II. The first test flights were carried out that year. Several changes were made to the system, but the basic design remained the same. It measured , with fins at the tail and one set of additional fins at each stage.

For shorter ranges, some of the stages could be removed. It was launched from a simple rail on a mobile trailer, based on the one used to transport the V-2. It was aimed simply by pointing the trailer and elevating the launch gantry, a method not guaranteed to be accurate.

Over 220 were constructed, with over 200 being used against the Belgian port of Antwerp between November 1944 and the end of the war. They caused only limited damage in small unpredictable areas of the city.

Some were fired from positions near the town of Nunspeet in the Netherlands.

The concept of long-range artillery rockets on the battlefield would remain undeveloped after the war. Even Rheinbote was not used in its intended role, but instead as a smaller version of the V-2 missile in the strategic role, for which its warhead was essentially useless due to its poor accuracy, small size, and its fusing, since it tended to bury itself in the ground before exploding.

After the war, the Soviet Union seized the design.

Design 
The Rheinbote was a four-stage solid fuel rocket. Each of the four stages fired in succession with the first stage getting the rocket off the ground, the second and third stages lifting it further aloft, and the fourth stage lifting it to its maximum altitude. It was a ballistic missile with relatively low accuracy. The accuracy of the Rheinbote was found impossible to calculate after tests, because the craters proved too small to find.

Characteristics 
 Primary function: artillery support
 Contractor: Rheinmetall-Borsig
 Fuel source: diglycol-dinitrate solid propellant rocket
 Length: 
 Diameter:
 Wingspan:
 Launch weight: 
 Speed:  
 Warhead: 
 Range:   (effective);  (maximum)
 Fuzes:
 Unit cost:
 Date deployed: November 1944
 Users: Germany

See also 
 List of World War II guided missiles of Germany

Notes

Sources 

World War II weapons of Germany
Rocket weapons